Callangoan, New South Wales is a bounded rural locality of Gilgandra Shire, and a civil parish of Gowen County, a county of New South Wales.

The parish is on the Castlereagh River midway between Gulargambone and Gilgandra.

A settlement called Curbin was planned at the confluence of the Castlereagh River and  Terrabile Creek,  but it never developed. The main feature of the economy of the locality is agriculture.

References

Localities in New South Wales
Geography of New South Wales
Central West (New South Wales)